The Rhode Island Republican Party is the affiliate of the United States Republican Party in Rhode Island.

Elected officials

Members of Congress

U.S. Senate
 None

Both of Rhode Island's U.S. Senate seats have been held by Democrats since 2006. Lincoln Chafee was the last Republican to represent Rhode Island in the U.S. Senate. First elected in 2000, Chafee lost his bid for a second term in 2006 to Sheldon Whitehouse who has held the seat since.

U.S. House of Representatives
None

Both of Rhode Island's congressional districts have been held by Democrats since 1994. The last Republican to represent Rhode Island in the House of Representatives was Ronald Machtley. First elected in 1988, Machtley opted not to run for re-election in 1994, instead unsuccessfully running for the Republican nomination for Governor. Kevin Vigilante ran as the Republican nominee in the 1994 election and was subsequently defeated by Democratic challenger Patrick J. Kennedy.

Statewide offices
 None

Rhode Island has not elected any GOP candidates to statewide office since 2006, when Donald Carcieri was re-elected as governor. In 2010, term limits prevented Carcieri from seeking a third term. Businessman John Robitaille ran as the Republican nominee in the 2010 election and was subsequently defeated by Independent challenger Lincoln Chafee.

Legislative
Senate Minority Leader: Jessica de la Cruz
House Minority Leader: Michael Chippendale

Local
Cranston
Ken Hopkins, Mayor
Town Councils
58 out of 182 possible seats - 32%
School Board Committee Members
22 out of 64 possible seats - 34%
Town Executives
10 out of 25 possible seats - 40%

References

External links
 http://www.RI.gop

Political parties in Rhode Island
Rhode Island